Long Flat is a semi-rural satellite locality of Murray Bridge in South Australia on the east bank of the Murray River south of the eponymous bridge and Swanport Bridge.

The locality was formally named after the Long Flat Irrigation Area in March 2000.

Location
Its boundaries were formalised in March 2000 to cover a portion of land immediately across the river to the east of the main Murray Bridge conurbation. It is bounded on the north and east by the Adelaide-Melbourne railway line, on the south by the South Eastern Freeway, and on the west by a  stretch of the river. The defunct Rabila Railway Station is on the locality's northern boundary. Long Island Recreation Park on Long Island, within the Murray River, is westerly adjacent to the locality.

See also
 List of cities and towns in South Australia

References 

Towns in South Australia